Magiria is a monotypic snout moth genus described by Philipp Christoph Zeller in 1867. Its only species, Magiria imparella, described by the same author, is found in Australia.

References

Moths described in 1867
Phycitini
Monotypic moth genera
Moths of Australia
Pyralidae genera